Pandinurus pallidus, is a species of scorpion native to Africa.

Distribution
This species is native to Somalia.

References

External links

Endemic fauna of Somalia
Scorpionidae
Fauna of Somalia
Animals described in 1894